Gediz Üniversitesi Gençlik ve Spor Kulübü, known as Orkide Gediz Üniversitesi for sponsorship reasons, is a Turkish professional basketball club based in İzmir which plays Turkish Basketball League (TBL). The team was founded by Gediz University in 2010. Their home arena is Gediz Üniversitesi Sports Hall with a capacity of 250 seats. The team is sponsored by Orkide which is a liquid oil company in Turkey.

External links 
 Gediz Üniversitesi Basketbol Kulübü, Official Website

Basketball teams in Turkey
Basketball teams established in 2010
Sports teams in İzmir